The 1964 SFR Yugoslavia Chess Championship was the 19th edition of SFR Yugoslav Chess Championship. Held in Zenica, SFR Yugoslavia, SR Bosnia & Herzegovina, between 26 November and 22 December 1963. The tournament was won by Borislav Ivkov and Mijo Udovčić.

References

External links 
 http://www.perpetualcheck.com/show/show.php?lan=cp&data=Y1963001&job=l
 https://www.partizanopedia.rs/1964%20sah.html
 https://www.chessgames.com/perl/chess.pl?tid=41304

Yugoslav Chess Championships
1964 in chess
Chess